Ole Gabriel Rasch (born 8 April 1976) is a Norwegian former road bicycle racer, who currently works as a directeur sportif for UCI WorldTeam .

Career
Rasch was born in Hole, Norway. For his first three professional contracts, Rasch was a teammate of countryman Thor Hushovd, and he has credited Hushovd with helping him break into the professional ranks. He won the Norwegian National Road Race Championship in 2003.

Rasch left  at the end of the 2012 season, and was scheduled to join the new  team for the 2013 season. However, it was later announced that Rasch was joining  instead. Rasch completed his professional career with a 117th-place finish in Paris–Roubaix.

Personal life
Rasch currently resides in Monaco.

Major results

2000
 7th Overall Tour de l'Ain
 8th Overall Tour de Slovaquie
2001
 2nd Road race, National Road Championships
 9th Overall Ringerike GP
2002
 2nd Overall Ringerike GP
2003
 1st  Road race, National Road Championships
 6th Mi-Août 3
2004
 3rd Overall Ringerike GP
2005
 5th Overall Tour de Slovaquie
 7th Overall Rás Tailteann
 7th Overall Ringerike GP
2006
 1st Overall Ringerike GP
 1st GP Möbel Alvisse
 2nd Overall Cinturón a Mallorca
 2nd Druivenkoers
 3rd Overall Tour de la Somme
 4th Overall Rhône-Alpes Isère Tour
 6th Grote Prijs Stad Zottegem
 7th Colliers Classic
 8th Overall Roserittet
 9th GP Herning
2007
 1st Overall Gjøvik GP
 1st Overall Rhône-Alpes Isère Tour
1st Stage 3
 3rd Overall Ringerike GP
 4th Overall Paris–Corrèze
 6th Sparkassen Giro Bochum
 8th Overall Rheinland-Pfalz Rundfahrt
 9th Overall Circuit des Ardennes
2008
 5th Tro-Bro Léon
 6th Overall Circuit Franco-Belge
2011
 1st Overall Ringerike GP
 7th Overall Tour of Qatar
 10th Overall Tour de Picardie

Grand Tour general classification results timeline

References

External links

 Team Ineos profile 
 
 

1976 births
Living people
Norwegian male cyclists
Cyclists at the 2008 Summer Olympics
Olympic cyclists of Norway
People from Buskerud
Directeur sportifs
People from Hole, Norway
Sportspeople from Viken (county)